University of Benghazi, formerly known as Garyounis University, is a public university in Benghazi, Libya, the country's second-largest city as well as one of the most prestigious.institutes of higher education in the country, however, it was founded as the University of Libya on December 15, 1955. University of Libya.

History 
The University of Libya was divided into two institutions in 1976: the University of Tripoli, situated in the region's capital in the northwest, whereas the University of Benghazi, located in the country's second metropolitan area in the northeast. As a result of the division, each university was authorized to form its own designation; hence, the University of Tripoli and in 1976 the University of Benghazi both entities were entitled to Al-Fateh University and Garyouins University, respectively. During the 2011 Libyan Civil War, the title of Garyounis University was once more transformed to the University of Benghazi.

The University of Benghazi consists of 23 faculties and 230 departments and institutes in Benghazi city. Nonetheless, in 2020, the Faculty of Arts dissolved one of its literary faculties into two sections, increasing the overall number of faculties to 24.

On April 17, 2016, the Libyan National Army overpowered the militants who had seized the city and the surrounding territory in order to train their troops while launching missiles towards the city. Considering the fact that, during the civil war, the University of Benghazi students were dispersed to a significant number of primary, secondary and high schools in order to finalise their educations.

Amal Bayou was one of the university's professors.

See also

 List of split up universities

References

 
1955 establishments in Libya
Educational institutions established in 1955
Benghazi
Benghazi